Citharomangelia elevata is a species of sea snail, a marine gastropod mollusk in the family Mangeliidae.

Description
The length of the shell attains 15 mm, its diameter 4 mm.

The white shell has a fusiform shape with 9 whorls, of which 2–3 in the protoconch. The spire is rather elongate, occupying rather more than half the entire length of the shell.  Between the ribs, above the angle, the whorls are faintly stained with a very pale dirty olive tint. It contains 10 straight axial ribs on the penultimate whorl. The aperture is slightly narrow and long. The outer lip is incrassate at the lowest rib and is slightly sinuate at the top. The siphonal canal is short and fairly narrow.

Distribution
This marine species occurs in the Persian Gulf.

References

 J.C., 1917. A revision of the Turridae (Pleurotomidae) occurring in the Persian Gulf, Gulf of Oman and north Arabian Sea as evidenced mostly through the results of dredgings carried out by Mr F. W. Townsend, 1893~1914. Proc. Malac. Soc. Lond. 12: 140–201, pls. 8–10

External links
  Tucker, J.K. 2004 Catalog of recent and fossil turrids (Mollusca: Gastropoda). Zootaxa 682:1–1295.
 Kilburn R.N. 1992. Turridae (Mollusca: Gastropoda) of southern Africa and Mozambique. Part 6. Subfamily Mangeliinae, section 1. Annals of the Natal Museum, 33: 461–575

elevata
Gastropods described in 1884